Gregory Dean Camp (born April 2, 1967) is an American guitarist, songwriter, and vocalist. He is best known as a founding member of the rock band Smash Mouth and served as a guitarist and songwriter across several stints (1994–2008, 2009–2011, 2014, 2018–2019). Camp is credited as the primary songwriter, whose songs catapulted the band to acclaim with hits, awards, and multi-platinum albums. Camp left Smash Mouth after 16 years and has remained an active songwriter and music producer, though he has rejoined Smash Mouth periodically. Camp is currently a member of The Defiant.

Biography
Camp was born in West Covina, California, but attended Lynbrook High School in San Jose, California.  Before Smash Mouth, he had been a musician in the California rock scene since the 1980s. He was part of several bands including the Gents, when Steve Harwell and Kevin Coleman approached him to form a new band. Camp declined, but Harwell and Coleman persisted, including harassing Camp with a morning pounding on his apartment window, until Camp agreed to look at the songs they had written. They formed Smash Mouth soon after.

Camp has written Smash Mouth's most memorable songs of the later 1990s and early 2000s, including "Walkin' on the Sun," "All Star," and "Then the Morning Comes". Camp's song Heave-Ho was about his experience living in San Jose's St Leo neighborhood. He was the guitarist and backing vocalist from when he co-founded the band in 1994 until he left in summer of 2008, though he has rejoined them periodically.

After leaving Smash Mouth, Camp released a solo album, Defektor, on Bar/None Records. Guitar Player wrote that the album "weaves together everything you love about vintage guitar tones, tortured Farfisa, '60s frat-rock vocal hooks, and epic Morricone-esque soundscapes."

In June 2009 Camp played a couple of concerts with Smash Mouth, but never rejoined the band. He also plays guitar and sings with Santa Cruz rock band The Maids of Honor and Los Angeles The Selectrics. Camp currently works as a songwriter and producer in Los Angeles.

In March 2023 it was announced that Camp had co-founded the band The Defiant along with Dicky Barrett of The Mighty Mighty Bosstones and members of The Offspring, Street Dogs and The Briggs. Their debut album is due out in early 2023.

References

External links
 
 

1967 births
Living people
Musicians from San Jose, California
Writers from San Jose, California
People from the San Gabriel Valley
American rock guitarists
American male guitarists
Songwriters from California
Interscope Records artists
People from West Covina, California
Smash Mouth members
Guitarists from California
20th-century American guitarists
Lynbrook High School alumni
Bar/None Records artists